Ending Themes (On the Two Deaths of Pain of Salvation) is a live album and documentary by Swedish progressive metal band Pain of Salvation. It was released on January 26, 2009, with a DVD version released on March 3, 2009. The DVD release has a double disc feature. The first disc has an 80-minute documentary of the band's 2005 world tour directed by Per Hillblom and the second disc has the full concert video from the Paradiso show recorded on March 2, 2007. A limited edition version will also be released that will include a double audio CD version of the Amsterdam concert. The CD version was released independently of the DVDs as well.

The DVD is named in recognition of the two line-up changes in the previous few years. At the end of the 2005 world tour (The First Death Of) Kristoffer Gildenlöw left the band because he was not able to attend rehearsals since he lived in a different country to the rest of the band. He was temporarily replaced by Simon Andersson. The second change, at the end of the 2007 world tour (The Second Death Of), was when Johan Langell left the band to concentrate on family commitments. He was replaced by Léo Margarit, who has remained a member of the band since.

Track listing
All music by Daniel Gildenlöw, except "Hallelujah" by Leonard Cohen.

DVD1 - The First Death Of

SixWorlds/EightDays (80-minute documentary of 2005 world tour by Per Hillblom)

DVD2 - The Second Death Of

Touching You Harder: Live from Amsterdam
 "Scarsick"
 "America"
 "Nightmist"
 "! (Foreword)"
 "Handful of Nothing"
 "New Year's Eve"
 "Ashes"
 "Undertow"
 "Brickworks 1 (Parts II-IV)"
 "Chain Sling"
 "Diffidentia"
 "Flame to the Moth"
 "Disco Queen"
 "Hallelujah"
 "Cribcaged"
 "Used"

CD1
 "Scarsick" - 7:09
 "America" - 5:55
 "Nightmist" - 7:48
 "! (Foreword)" 6:47
 "Handful of Nothing" 7:43
 "New Year's Eve" - 5:48
 "Ashes" - 5:25
 "Undertow" - 5:11

CD2
 "Brickworks 1 (Parts II-IV)" - 6:25
 "Chain Sling" - 3:59
 "Diffidentia" - 7:36
 "Flame to the Moth" - 6:04
 "Disco Queen" - 8:15
 "Hallelujah" - 9:04
 "Cribcaged" - 6:24
 "Used" - 5:43

Personnel
Pain of Salvation live from Amsterdam 2007
Daniel Gildenlöw – lead vocals, guitars
Johan Hallgren – guitars, harmony vocals
Fredrik Hermansson – keyboards, backing vocals
Simon Andersson – bass guitar, backing vocals
Johan Langell – drums, backing vocals

Additional members present in 2005 documentary
Kristoffer Gildenlöw – bass guitar, vocals

External links
Official website

Pain of Salvation albums
2009 live albums
Live video albums
2009 video albums
Inside Out Music live albums
Inside Out Music video albums